is a retired Japanese light weight powerlifter. He was admitted to the International Powerlifting Federation Hall of Fame in 1979.

References

1944 births
Japanese powerlifters
Living people
Competitors at the 2001 World Games